Kaçar is a Turkish surname. Notable people with the surname include:

Betül Kaçar, Turkish American academic
Giray Kaçar (born 1985), Turkish footballer 
Hasan Hüseyin Kaçar (born 1988), Turkish disabled middle and long distance runner

Turkish-language surnames